Kirovaul is a rural locality (a selo) in Kizilyurtovsky District of the Republic of Dagestan, Russia.

History
In 2010, Kirovaul was the scene of some fatal shooting incidents.

Notable people
Khabib Nurmagomedov, Two-time Combat Sambo World Champion and the former UFC Lightweight Champion.

References

Rural localities in Kizilyurtovsky District